Suicide Medicine is an album by Rocky Votolato. It was released on September 16, 2003, by the independent label Second Nature Recordings. Votolato’s third studio effort is described by some critics as a darker, more brooding album than his 2001 release, Burning My Travels Clean.

Track listing
"The Light And The Sound"
"Suicide Medicine"
"I'll Catch You"
"Automatic Rifle"
"Every Red Cent" 
"Montana"
"Alabaster" 
"The City Is Calling"
"Secrets Of A Salesman"
"Prison Is Private Property"
"Death-Right"
"Mix Tapes/Cellmates"

References

2003 albums
Rocky Votolato albums